Anthony Jacob (born 18 May 1989) is a Canadian rower. He competed in the men's coxless four event at the 2012 Summer Olympics.

References

External links
 

1989 births
Living people
Canadian male rowers
Olympic rowers of Canada
Rowers at the 2012 Summer Olympics
Rowers from Vancouver